Jadunath may refer to

 Jadunath Kisku, Indian politician
 Jadunath Majumdar, Indian journalist and writer
 Jadunath Sarkar, Indian historian
 Jadunath Singh, Indian Army soldier
 Jadunath Sinha, Indian philosopher, writer and religious seeker
Jadunath Supakar, Indian artist and textile designer

Indian masculine given names